The Romanian Orthodox Patriarchal Cathedral (also known as the Metropolitan Church) is a functioning religious and civic landmark, on Dealul Mitropoliei, in Bucharest, Romania. It is located near the Palace of the Chamber of Deputies of the Patriarchate of the Romanian Orthodox Church. Since it is a working cathedral, it is the site of many religious holidays and observances that take place for those who follow the Orthodox Christian faith in Bucharest, including a Palm Sunday pilgrimage. The Orthodox Divine Liturgy at the cathedral is known for its a cappella choir, a common practice shared by all the Orthodox churches, in both their prayer services and liturgical rites. The Romanian Orthodox Patriarchal Cathedral is a designated Historical monument—Monument istoric of Romania.

History
The structure was begun in 1655 and completed in 1659 under the orders of the prince Constantin Șerban. The façade is in the Brâncovenesc style. All of the original frescoes and sculptures were destroyed, except for the icon of Constantine and Helen, who are the patron saints of the cathedral. The present-day frescoes were added in 1923 by Dimitrie Belizarie.

In 1862, the Romanian prime minister, Barbu Catargiu, was assassinated as his open carriage passed in front of the cathedral.

See also
Romanian Orthodox Church

Gallery

References

External links

Patriarchal Cathedral
Patriarchal Cathedral, Romanian
Cathedral
Religious buildings and structures completed in 1658
1650s establishments in Romania
1658 establishments in Europe
Historic monuments in Bucharest
Brâncovenesc style architecture
17th-century architecture in Romania